21st Century Texts is an album by American jazz trumpeter Raphe Malik, which was recorded live during the Workshop Freie Musik at The Akademie der Künste in Berlin, and released on the German FMP label. Malik reformed his quintet in 1989 with his old partner Glenn Spearman on tenor, Brian King Nelson on C-melody sax, Larry Roland on bass and Dennis Warren on drums. The ensemble toured Europe in 1991 for a series of four concerts.

Reception

In his review for AllMusic, Michael G. Nastos states:

The Penguin Guide to Jazz notes:

Track listing
All compositions by Raphe Malik
 "AB dedicated to A.B. Spellman" – 15:26
 "CC dedicated to Duke Ellinton" – 6:50
 "Blue 2 dedicated to Miles Davis" – 5:37 
 "Talk dedicated to Miles Davis" – 14:51
 "Companions Too dedicated to Jimmy Lyons" – 9:06
 "T's Quiet Time dedicated to Thelonious Monk" – 8:07
 "Extensions" – 14:02

Personnel
Raphe Malik – trumpet
Brian King Nelson – C-melody sax
Glenn Spearman – tenor sax 
Larry Roland – bass
Dennis Warren – drums

References

 
1992 live albums
Raphe Malik live albums
FMP Records live albums